Norman Fletcher may refer to:
Norman C. Fletcher (1917–2007), American architect
Norman S. Fletcher (born 1934), American lawyer and jurist
Norman Stanley Fletcher, fictional character known as "Fletch" in UK TV sitcom Porridge
Norman Vyner Fletcher (1867–1889), Australian botanist
Norm Fletcher (footballer, born 1884) (1884–1938), Australian rules footballer for Geelong
Norm Fletcher (footballer, born 1915) (1915–1992), Australian rules footballer for South Melbourne and Hawthorn